Joher Khadim Rassoul (born 31 December 1995) is a Senegalese footballer who currently plays as a defensive midfielder for Turkish club Alanyaspor on loan from Eyüpspor.

Career 

Rassoul joined Lokeren in 2015 from R.S.C. Anderlecht. He made his Belgian Pro League debut on 28 November 2015 against Charleroi.

On 17 January 2019, he has joined Adana Demirspor with a two-and-a-half year contract.

References

External links

1995 births
Living people
Senegalese footballers
Senegalese expatriate footballers
Belgian Pro League players
Süper Lig players
TFF First League players
K.S.C. Lokeren Oost-Vlaanderen players
Adana Demirspor footballers
Alanyaspor footballers
Expatriate footballers in Turkey
Association football midfielders